Cecile Cilliers (May 24, 1933 – June 16, 2018) was an Afrikaans freelance journalist and writer. The writer Madeleine van Biljon is her sister. She is predominantly known for her essays, but also published among others a children's collection and a number of religious books. She was involved in the N.G. Kerk and was the first non-ministerial woman to be elected vice-chairperson of the Sinodal Committee. In addition to her performance of the Christian Network Television's Program Focus Point, she also presented the television program Boeksusters on KykNET with her sister, Madeleine van Biljon.

Life and work

Early life 
Anneke Cecile Pretorius was born in Franschhoek in 1933 as the second youngest of four children. The famous author Madeleine van Biljon is one of her sisters. She has another sister, Rouxline (also called Polla), and a brother, Nicholas. Abraham Johannes (Braam) Pretorius, her father (born 10 May 1900 at Rustenburg, was a clerk in the magistrate's office, and her mother is Madeleine Roux. Her father was a Senator and was tallest magistrate in South Africa. As a result of his profession as magistrate, the family moved around a lot.

Education 
Cilliers began her schooling in Paarl, after which she went to Johannesburg to Jan Celliers Primary School. Her high school education was at Montagu, where she matriculated. After her matric year, her father was transferred to Johannesburg and she enrolled for a secretarial course at the Technical College. However, she realized that this would not offer her an attractive career. A year later she joined University of Pretoria where she obtained a B.A. degree in Afrikaans-Dutch, English, German, French and Art History as subjects.

Awards 
The Tuks Alumni Association honoured her in 2011 with the Laureate Award. She is also an honorary citizen of Biesies Valley in the Northern Cape.

Publications 
Her works include:

Bibliography

Books 

 Kannemeyer, J.C. Die Afrikaanse literatuur 1652–2004. Human & Rousseau Cape Town and Pretoria First edition 2005
 Van Coller, H.P. (red.) Perspektief en Profiel Deel 2. J.L. van Schaik-Uitgewers Pretoria First edition 1999

Magazines and newspaper 

 De Vos, Willa. Haar woorde het by ’n tiekie op die tafel begin. Die Voorligter March 1996
 Fourie, Corlia. Om te groet en oor te begin. Rooi Rose, 21 February 1996
 Rautenbach, Elmari. Siela en Maad. Insig, January 2001
 Tancred, Elise-Marie. Ons vroue kán dit doen. Rooi Rose, 23 December 1998
 Van der Merwe, Lydia. Cecile Cilliers wys haar foto's. Sarie, 26 February 1997

Internet 

 Die Burger: http://152.111.1.87/argief/berigte/dieburger/1995/02/01/9/7.html
 Jackson, Neels Beeld: http://152.111.1.88/argief/berigte/beeld/1998/10/17/9/4.html

References 

1933 births
2018 deaths
20th-century South African women writers
21st-century South African women writers
Afrikaner people
Afrikaans-language writers
People from Stellenbosch Local Municipality